Eric Crees (born 1952) was appointed Principal Trombone of the Royal Opera House, Covent Garden (London) in 2000. Before that he spent twenty-seven years at the London Symphony Orchestra, twenty as Co-Principal Trombone. He is also a noted brass conductor, composer, arranger and teacher.

Education 
Eric Crees was born in London in 1952 and studied at Wandsworth School, where  he worked with professional orchestras & conductors in the boy's choir. Of particular importance was the school's long association with Benjamin Britten, who wrote a solo part for Eric in Children's Crusade.

While at school he was awarded a scholarship to study part-time at the Guildhall School of Music & Drama. He went on to study music at the University of Surrey and undertook an extensive period of work with the Philip Jones Brass Ensemble. He also won the Mechanical Copyright Protection Society's 'Joyce Dixey Award' for composition. Upon graduation he joined the London Symphony Orchestra.

Professional life

Professor 
As Professor of Trombone at the Guildhall School of Music and Drama he taught trombonists of the next generation of orchestral principals including Helen Vollam, Byron Fulcher and Graham Lee. He was made Fellow of the School in 1991.

Crees is also a coach at music colleges & specialist schools both in the UK & abroad, including the National Youth Orchestra of Great Britain, the Ulster Youth Orchestra and the Pacific Youth Orchestra in Japan.

Conductor and Director 
Crees is Director of the Royal Opera House Brass Soloists and for many years was Director of the London Symphony Orchestra Brass. With the LSO Brass they performed regularly at the Barbican Centre and made several recordings, including American Brass and Cathedral Brass for Collins Classics. These featuring many of his arrangements, including Bernstein's Suite from West Side Story which has been commercially recorded four times.

Other arrangements include Aaron Copland's El Salon Mexico and Charles Ives' Variations on 'America'. Crees also prepared a Performing Edition and directed the LSO Brass in a trio of CDs for Naxos covering the complete instrumental music by Giovanni Gabrieli.

In 1994, Crees was invited by Cala Records to arrange a number of pieces for 16 trombones from the London orchestras to record on a CD called "The London Trombone Sound". The popularity of Samuel Barber's Adagio and Eric Clapton's Layla led to more arrangements for The London Horn Sound.

Since 2011 Crees has been the artistic director of the live brass ensemble The Symphonic Brass of London. In 2020, the group released a CD of arrangements "Preludes, Rags and Cakewalks." This album "masterfully collated" the impressionism of Claude Debussy and the syncopated rhythms of Scott Joplin, as well as Auric, Milhaud and Satie. The CD is published on the MPR label.

Composer 

Recent original compositions include

 Silk Street Stomp written for the Guildhall School of Music Big Band
 Two Antiphonal Fanfares Frighteners' Gallop for 8 horns commissioned by the British Horn Society
 Orage for 16 trombones, written for Bone Lab and premiered at the Dartington Summer School
 Processional for PJ written for large brass ensemble in memory of Philip Jones, 
 The Birth of Conchobar for symphonic brass and percussion commissioned by the Ulster Youth Orchestra
 Three Sketches from Rackham for flute and harp.
 Flourish for solo trombone
 Carillons for six harps.

Juror 
Crees is a juror for international competitions, such as the Donatella Flick Conducting competition, the Leonard Berstein Conducting Competition, in Jerusalem, the Narbonne International Quintet Competition, the National Brass Championships, the European Brass Band Championships and the All England Masters Brass Band Championship.

Recordings 
Berg Kammerkonzert - Abbado, LSO (1985, Sony SMK64504)
Mahler Symphony No. 3 - Tilson Thomas, LSO (1987, CBS M2K44553, deleted)
American Brass - Crees, LSO Brass (1991, Collins Classics; re-issued 2013, Alto/Musical Concepts)
Cathedral Brass - Crees, LSO Brass (1991, Collins Classics)
Gabrieli Music for Brass, Vol. 1-3 - Crees, LSO Brass (1995-7, Naxos 8.553609 etc.)
London Trombone Sound (1995, Cala CACD 0108)

References

External links
Eric Crees Official site
Eric Crees' Artistic Director page on The Symphonic Brass of London

1952 births
20th-century British male musicians
20th-century classical trombonists
21st-century British male musicians
21st-century classical trombonists
Alumni of the Guildhall School of Music and Drama
Alumni of the University of Surrey
British classical trombonists
Living people
Male trombonists